Nerene Virgin is a Canadian journalist, actress, educator, author  and television host, best known for her role on the children's television series Today's Special.

Background 

Virgin was born in Hamilton, Ontario. She is a great-granddaughter of escaped Maryland slave Thomas John (Howard) Holland, and great-niece of pastor John Christie Holland.   She was born Nerene Grizzle, daughter of Kathleen V. Toliver and  Stanley G. Grizzle. After growing up in Toronto, she attended Toronto Teacher's College. Virgin was also certified as a Special Education teacher at Brock University focussing on intellectually gifted children and holds special qualifications in teaching Integrated Arts. Virgin began her career as a teacher, working for the Toronto Board of Education. She later moved into children's programming with Ontario's public broadcaster TV Ontario, playing "Jodie" on Today's Special. This internationally acclaimed series was in production for seven years. Virgin also had recurring roles on other television programs, including The Littlest Hobo, Night Heat and Ramona.  Initially, Virgin had played the role of Ellie the dispatch girl on Police Surgeon, a CTV series originally named Dr. Simon Locke.  She appeared in numerous film roles such as Gotti, The Undergrads, Murder in Space, and Right of the People.  Virgin's entertainment career began as a singer with the Tiaras, a Toronto-based girl group.  Virgin joined Colina Phillips and Patricia Grizzle after Brenda Russell had left the trio and moved to Los Angeles.

Virgin worked as the weather and community reporter for CBOT, the local CBC Television station in Ottawa, in the late 1980s.  She then worked at CTV station CFTO in Toronto as the host of Eye on Toronto, co-host for the entertainment show Showbuz, and a host on CTV's annual Miracle Network Telethon for the Hospital for Sick Children.

In 1996, Virgin became the host for the daily national current affairs show Coast to Coast for CBC Newsworld in Calgary, Alberta. She returned to Toronto as the anchor to launch the national weekend newscast Saturday Report for CBC Television. She then moved to the anchor chair at Newsworld International until it was dismantled and taken over by Al Gore's Current TV in July 2005.  Virgin then chose to leave CBC to complete further studies, gaining certification in teaching ESL (English as a Second Language) and taught students in Linhe, Inner Mongolia, China. She later taught French in Stoney Creek.

She currently serves on the board of directors for Phoenix Place, a second stage home for women and children who have survived domestic violence.  She is also a member, and part of the executive, of the council for the College of Early Childhood Educators, the first such college in North America.  Virgin serves as a member of Hamilton's Committee Against Racism for the 2010–2014 and 2014-2018 Term of Council.

Black History work 
Virgin has applied her educational background and journalism skills to research, write and present stories of notable Blacks in Canadian/U.S. history.  She has published biographies of Charles Victor Roman,  Charles Lightfoot Roman and Rev. John Christie Holland with Historica Canada. These articles have been published in The Canadian Encyclopedia. Nerene has worked with the Dundas Museum and Archives to nominate C. V. Roman as a laureate to the Canadian Medical Hall of Fame.  She is now working with the Hamilton-Wentworth District School Board to embed Black History into the regular school curriculum. Virgin’s educational presentations are often based on the exploits of her great-great grandfather, Private Lewis Toliver and his eleven-year service in the “All Coloured Militia” during the Upper Canada Rebellion 1837–38 and the building of the Second Welland Canal.  This endeavor is a pilot project for the Ministry of Education (Ontario).

Political career 
Virgin first sought political office in 2007 in the federal riding of Hamilton Mountain but she later withdrew from the race. She then decided to seek political office in Hamilton East—Stoney Creek, even though she resides outside the riding boundaries.

On July 31, 2007, after using a three-member panel interview process, the Ontario Liberal Party announced that Virgin had been acclaimed as the candidate in Hamilton East—Stoney Creek for the 2007 provincial election.  The panel consisted of incumbent MPP Jennifer Mossop (who did not seek reelection), a party organizer, and the riding president.  The decision to appoint Virgin upset some local Liberal party members but Virgin expressed optimism in being able to reach out to the grassroots. Mossop, the Stoney Creek incumbent MPP at the time, is also a former television journalist.

In the aftermath of Virgin's acclamation as a candidate, she was racially slurred and allegedly misrepresented in the media, with the Hamilton Community News, a weekly newspaper in Hamilton, referring to her as a "tar baby".  While the paper issued an apology for its use of the pejorative term, Virgin indicated that the paper should do more than just apologize, suggesting setting up a scholarship, or a program designed to address racism and discrimination. Virgin sued Metroland Media Group due to that racial slur.  She was represented by lawyers Kikelola Roach, Charles Roach and Julian Porter.  The newspaper settled the lawsuit to Virgin’s satisfaction.

On election day, Virgin finished second to New Democrat candidate Paul Miller.

Electoral record 
Riding:  Hamilton East—Stoney Creek (provincial electoral district)

Filmography

Film and television appearances

Awards
On May 2, 2016, it was announced that Virgin was named one of Canada’s 100 Accomplished Black Canadian Women. Previously, in February 2012, she was honored for Professional Achievement and had received a Rev. John C. Holland Award, an award named after her great uncle John Christie Holland. 
 Virgin also received an Illuminesence Award in 2014. Virgin was in her mid-teens when she was crowned Miss Sepia Toronto.  She had expected that this would lead her to be a contestant in the Miss Canada Pageant but was later told that, at that time, apparently a black girl would not be allowed to compete.

References

External links 
 

Year of birth missing (living people)
Canadian television actresses
Canadian children's television personalities
Canadian people of African-American descent
Canadian people of Jamaican descent
Canadian television news anchors
Black Canadian actresses
Black Canadian politicians
Black Canadian broadcasters
Living people
Ontario Liberal Party candidates in Ontario provincial elections
Women in Ontario politics
Canadian women television journalists
Actresses from Hamilton, Ontario